Aïn Kercha  is a town and commune in Oum El Bouaghi Province, Algeria.

Localities  of the commune 
The commune of Aïn Kercha is composed of 10 localities:

2014 plane crash
On 11 February 2014, a C-130 Hercules transport aircraft of the Algerian Air Force crashed near Aïn Kercha, killing 77 of the 78 people on board.

References 

Communes of Oum El Bouaghi Province
Oum El Bouaghi Province